George Ellison may refer to:

 George Ellison (academic) (died 1557), Master of University College, Oxford, England (1551–1557)
 George Edwin Ellison (1878–1918), last British soldier to be killed in the First World War
 George Ellison (baseball) (1897–1978), American Major League Baseball pitcher

See also 
 Ellison